The Domino is a loose mortise and tenon joining tool manufactured by the German company Festool.

History and description
The idea for this tool came from German master cabinetmaker Vitus Rommel.
First on the US market in 2007, the Domino tool cuts a full mortise in a single plunge, just like a biscuit joiner does but using instead a drill-like rotating cutter with a spinning bit that also moves sideways to cut a full round-ended mortise in a single plunge. There are five cutter sizes (4 mm, 5 mm, 6 mm, 8 mm and 10 mm) for six different Domino tenon sizes. Self-referencing pins allow the cutting of rows of evenly spaced mortises with no need to measure and mark. Mortise width is adjustable in three increments with the turn of a knob, and cuts can be overlapped for long mortises. Fence tilts vary from 0-90°, with stop positions at 0°, 22.5°, 45°, 67.5°, and 90°. The plunge depth is also adjustable.

Domino XL
The Domino XL is, as the name implies, the Domino's larger cousin. It uses the same cutter design as the original Domino, yet uses much larger tenons. The width of a mortise can be up to 14 mm, its length up to 140 mm and its depth up to 70 mm, thus allowing for tenons with a depth of up to 140 mm.

Advantages
Allows very quick joinery, useful in a commercial carpentry setting.
Flat tenons resists torquing.
Stronger than a biscuit joiner.

Disadvantages
High tool cost comparative to other joinery methods
Proprietary tenons (dowels) required
Noise and dust (dust extraction required)

See also
Biscuit joiner — general page on biscuit joinery methods
Dowelmax — another loose tenon joinery system
Dowels - general page on dowels

References

External links
www.festool.net — Manufacturer's official international website
festoolusa.com — the Domino page at the Festool USA site

Woodworking hand-held power tools
Joinery